John Joseph Ryan (April 3, 1886 – April 7, 1950) was an American football and basketball player and coach. He served as the head football coach at the College of St. Thomas in Saint Paul, Minnesota from 1911 to 1912, at Marquette University from 1917 to 1921, and at the University of Wisconsin from 1923 to 1924, compiling a career college football record of 44–11–11. Ryan was also the head basketball coach at Marquette from 1917 to 1920, tallying a mark of 13–9.

Early life and playing career
Ryan was born on April 3, 1886, in Waterbury, Connecticut. He first attended New Hampshire College of Agriculture and the Mechanic Arts (which later became the University of New Hampshire), where he played quarterback on the 1906 New Hampshire football team. Ryan then attended Dartmouth College, where he played football, basketball, and baseball. He was captain of the 1910 Dartmouth football team.

Coaching career
After graduating from Dartmouth in 1911, Ryan began his coaching career at St. Thomas College in Saint Paul, Minnesota, where he was the school's first resident athletic coach. He moved to Milwaukee, Wisconsin, in 1914, where he worked for a flour milling firm based in Minneapolis, Minnesota. He joined the football team at Marquette University in 1916 as an advisory coach under fellow Dartmouth alumnus, John B. McAuliffe. Ryan replaced McAuliffe as head coach the following year and held the post for five seasons, during which he compiled a record of 28–5–5. He returned to his alma mater in 1922 to serve as an assistant to Jackson Cannell.

In March 1923, Ryan was hired as the head football coach at the University of Wisconsin. He was also given the title of assistant professor and paid an annual salary of $6,000. Ryan helmed the Badgers football team for two seasons, tallying a mark of 5–6–4. He moved to Northwestern University in 1925, where he was the ends coach for five seasons under Glenn Thistlethwaite and Dick Hanley. Ryan returned to Hanley's staff as an assistant coach and scout in 1934, and continued on under Pappy Waldorf until 1939.

Later life and death
Ryan served on the board of school directors in Milwaukee from 1940 until his death. He died on April 7, 1950, at St. Mary's Hospital in Milwaukee.

Head coaching record

Football

References

External links
 
 

1886 births
1950 deaths
20th-century American politicians
Basketball coaches from Connecticut
Dartmouth Big Green baseball players
Dartmouth Big Green football coaches
Dartmouth Big Green football players
New Hampshire Wildcats football players
Marquette Golden Avalanche football coaches
Marquette Golden Eagles men's basketball coaches
Northwestern Wildcats football coaches
St. Thomas (Minnesota) Tommies football coaches
Wisconsin Badgers football coaches
Sportspeople from Waterbury, Connecticut
School board members in Wisconsin
Players of American football from Connecticut